BBC One Scotland is a Scottish free-to-air television channel owned and operated by BBC Scotland and is a Scottish variation of the UK-wide BBC One. 

For all of the time the channel is referred to on screen as BBC One Scotland, sometimes using overlays to replace the normal channel identifier. The station also has its own team of continuity announcers, provided by BBC Scotland, to accommodate for the variations seen in Scotland from the rest of the BBC One network, whilst also providing the channel with an added Scottish identity. The announcers, based in Glasgow, also double up as transmission directors.

History

The first television service in Scotland was launched by the British Broadcasting Company on 1 January 1968.

Presentation
BBC One Scotland updated its visual presentation style as part of the network BBC One revamp on 7 October 2006. The presentation style fits in with the national BBC One 'Circle' idents, but with the "Scotland" caption added to the network logo.

Availability
An HD (high-definition) simulcast of BBC One Scotland launched on 14 January 2013 on Freeview, Freesat, Sky and Virgin Media. On 10 December 2013, BBC One Scotland HD was swapped with the SD channel on Sky's EPG for HD subscribers.

Programming

BBC One Scotland is responsible for covering certain special events such as the annual Hogmanay Live programme which sees in the New Year, and major Scottish sporting events such as football internationals, the Scottish Cup, Scotland's Six Nations rugby union campaigns, and the performance of Scottish competitors at the  Commonwealth Games and Olympic Games.

Whilst generally following the schedules of the UK-wide BBC One, BBC One Scotland offers  programming specific to Scotland, such as soap opera River City and football programme Sportscene. As a result of this, regular BBC One shows, such as Holby City, are scheduled at different regular times in Scotland, compared with the rest of the UK.

News, Sport and Weather specifically for Scotland are examples of the channel's distinct output.

Examples of BBC One Scotland programmes include:

 BBC Scotland Investigates
 The Beechgrove Garden
 Gary: Tank Commander
 Reporting Scotland
 River City
 Sportscene
 The Scheme
 24/7
 Still Game
 Scot Squad

References

External links

1952 establishments in Scotland
BBC television channels in the United Kingdom
English-language television stations in the United Kingdom
Television channels and stations established in 1952
BBC Scotland
Television channels in Scotland